Maradona in Mexico is a 2019 documentary web television series directed by Angus Macqueen and starring Diego Armando Maradona, Gilli Messer and Jarrod Pistilli. The premise is set in 2018-19 and revolves around the Argentinian soccer player Diego Maradona's coaching of Mexico's second division club Dorados de Sinaloa in Culiacán.

Cast 
 Diego Armando Maradona
 Gilli Messer
 Jarrod Pistilli

Release 
Maradona in Mexico was released on November 13, 2019, on Netflix.

References

External links
 
 

2019 American television series debuts
2019 American television series endings
2019 Argentine television series debuts
2019 Argentine television series endings
2019 Mexican television series debuts
2019 Mexican television series endings
2010s American documentary television series
Association football documentary television series
Spanish-language television shows
Spanish-language Netflix original programming
Netflix original documentary television series
Diego Maradona